In molecular biology, snoRNA U57 (also known as SNORD57)  is a member of the C/D box class of snoRNAs.  This family functions to direct site-specific 2'-O-methylation of substrate RNAs.

This snoRNA was originally cloned from human  HeLa cells during a screen for intron encoded snoRNAs. It is predicted to guide the 2'O-ribose methylation of 18S ribosomal RNA (rRNA) at residue A99 3

References

External links
 
 

Small nuclear RNA